Freddie Goodwin (28 June 1933 – 19 February 2016) was an English professional football player and manager. He also played county cricket for Lancashire.

Career
A wing half, Goodwin was signed as a trainee from Cheshire Schoolboys by Manchester United on 1 October 1953 as one of the Busby Babes. He made his senior debut for the club on 20 November 1954 against Arsenal. He helped the club win the 1956 and 1957 league championships, and was a member of the United team that made a comeback from the Munich air disaster that claimed the lives of eight players and ended the careers of two others, to reach the 1958 FA Cup Final, losing 2–0 to Bolton Wanderers. He was not on the plane to Munich, having not been selected in the squad for the quarter-final second leg tie with Red Star Belgrade of Yugoslavia.

In his United career, he scored eight goals in 107 appearances. He was signed by Leeds United on 16 March 1960 for £10,000. In the 1963–64 season, a collision with former Leeds teammate John Charles in an FA Cup tie against Cardiff City caused him to suffer a triple fracture of his leg, eventually resulting in his retirement from playing on 1 December 1964. He scored two goals in 120 appearances for Leeds.

Goodwin went on to become a player-manager at Scunthorpe United, although he did not play many games due to his injury, making six appearances and scoring one goal for the club. He left Scunthorpe United on 1 June 1966 and then became manager for the New York Generals (appearing in one match) and Brighton & Hove Albion, before becoming manager of Second Division club Birmingham City. It was at Birmingham where he introduced the young Trevor Francis into league football. At Birmingham, he was also known for introducing yoga, psychological testing and other new training techniques.

Goodwin also made 11 first-class appearances for Lancashire County Cricket Club (1955–1956) as a right-arm fast-medium bowler.

Later life
Goodwin later moved to the United States to coach and serve as president of the Minnesota Kicks. He later relocated to Washington state, where he coached Tacoma Stars and started a travel agency on Vashon Island. He died of cancer at Gig Harbor, Washington, on 19 February 2016 at the age of 82.

References

1933 births
2016 deaths
People from Heywood, Greater Manchester
English footballers
Manchester United F.C. players
Leeds United F.C. players
Scunthorpe United F.C. players
English football managers
Scunthorpe United F.C. managers
Birmingham City F.C. managers
North American Soccer League (1968–1984) coaches
North American Soccer League (1968–1984) executives
National Professional Soccer League (1967) coaches
National Professional Soccer League (1967) players
New York Generals (NPSL) players
English cricketers
Lancashire cricketers
People from Gig Harbor, Washington
Association football wing halves
English expatriate sportspeople in the United States
Expatriate soccer players in the United States
English expatriate footballers
FA Cup Final players